Dorrance is a city in Russell County, Kansas, United States.  As of the 2020 census, the population of the city was 146.

History
The Kansas Pacific Railway reached the site of Dorrance in June 1867. German, English, and Irish settlers followed shortly thereafter, forming a small community by 1870. In early 1872, they were joined by a colony of settlers from Pennsylvania. A prairie fire destroyed much of the community's business district in March 1879. The town of Dorrance was formally laid out in 1880, named for Oliver Dorrance, the railroad superintendent. The first post office opened in July 1883. Dorrance was incorporated in April 1910 and became a center of goods and services for eastern Russell County.

Geography
Dorrance is located at  (38.846977, -98.588338) at an elevation of 1,732 feet (528 m).

Climate
The climate in this area is characterized by hot, humid summers and generally mild to cool winters.  According to the Köppen Climate Classification system, Dorrance has a humid subtropical climate, abbreviated "Cfa" on climate maps.

Demographics

2010 census
As of the 2010 census, there were 185 people, 85 households, and 51 families residing in the city. The racial makeup of the city was 96.8% White, 2.7% American Indian, and 0.5% Asian. Hispanics and Latinos of any race were 0.5% of the population.

There were 85 households, of which 25.9% had children under the age of 18 living with them, 51.8% were married couples living together, 2.4% had a male householder with no wife present, 5.9% had a female householder with no husband present, and 40.0% were non-families. 36.5% of all households were made up of individuals, and 14.1% had someone living alone who was 65 years of age or older. The average household size was 2.18, and the average family size was 2.84.

In the city, the population was spread out, with 21.6% under the age of 18, 4.5% from 18 to 24, 22.6% from 25 to 44, 28.6% from 45 to 64, and 22.7% who were 65 years of age or older. The median age was 46.5 years. For every 100 females, there were 98.9 males. For every 100 females age 18 and over, there were 90.8 males age 18 and over.

The median income for a household in the city was $36,250, and the median income for a family was $36,000. Males had a median income of $43,438 versus $37,708 for females. The per capita income for the city was $18,126. 8.3% of families and 20.6% of the population were below the poverty line, including 36.8% of those under the age 18 and 0.0% of those age 65 or over.

2000 census
As of the census of 2000, there were 205 people, 94 households, and 56 families residing in the city. The racial makeup of the city was 99.51% White and 0.49% Asian. Hispanic or Latino of any race were 0.49% of the population.

There were 94 households, out of which 22.3% had children under the age of 18 living with them, 50.0% were married couples living together, 7.4% had a female householder with no husband present, and 39.4% were non-families. 35.1% of all households were made up of individuals, and 20.2% had someone living alone who was 65 years of age or older. The average household size was 2.18 and the average family size was 2.86.

In the city the population was spread out, with 21.0% under the age of 18, 6.3% from 18 to 24, 24.4% from 25 to 44, 29.3% from 45 to 64, and 19.0% who were 65 years of age or older. The median age was 44 years. For every 100 females, there were 89.8 males. For every 100 females age 18 and over, there were 84.1 males.

Economy
As of 2012, 64.8% of the population over the age of 16 was in the labor force. 0.0% was in the armed forces, and 64.8% was in the civilian labor force with 55.7% being employed and 9.0% unemployed. The composition, by occupation, of the employed civilian labor force was:  35.3% in management, business, science, and arts; 22.1% in sales and office occupations; 16.2% in service occupations; 13.2% in natural resources, construction, and maintenance; and 13.2% in production, transportation, and material moving. The three industries employing the largest percentages of the working civilian labor force were:  agriculture, forestry, fishing and hunting, and mining (27.9%); educational services, and health care and social assistance (26.5%); and manufacturing (14.7%).

The cost of living in Dorrance is relatively low; compared to a U.S. average of 100, the cost of living index for the community is 79.2. As of 2012, the median home value in the city was $51,300, and the median selected monthly owner cost was $656 for housing units with a mortgage and $304 for those without.

Government
Dorrance is a city of the third class with a mayor-council form of government. The city council consists of five members, and it meets on the second Saturday of each month.

Dorrance lies within Kansas's 1st U.S. Congressional District. For the purposes of representation in the Kansas Legislature, the city is located in the 36th district of the Kansas Senate and the 109th district of the Kansas House of Representatives.

Education
The community is served by Central Plains USD 112 public school district. Students attend schools in Wilson.

Dorrance schools were closed through school unification. The Dorrance Cardinals won the Kansas State High School boys class BB basketball championship in 1956.

Infrastructure

Transportation
Interstate 70 and U.S. Route 40 run concurrently east-west less than a mile north of the city. The old alignment of U.S. 40 runs southeast-northwest through Dorrance, intersecting 200th Boulevard, a paved county road formerly designated K-231, which runs north-south along the city's eastern edge.

Union Pacific Railroad operates a freight rail line, its Kansas Pacific (KP) line, through Dorrance. The line runs southeast-northwest through the community, parallel to the old alignment of U.S. 40.

Utilities
Western Electric provides electricity to local residents. H & B Communications provides landline telephone service and offers cable television and internet access. Most residents use natural gas for heating fuel; service is provided by Midwest Energy, Inc.

Media
Dorrance is in the Wichita-Hutchinson, Kansas television market.

Culture

Points of interest
The Dorrance Historical Society Museum, located downtown, exhibits artifacts from the community's history.

In popular culture and the arts
Dorrance was among the filming locations for the 1973 film Paper Moon.

Toss Back, the company which invented and first produced the "Snap Back" rim used in NBA basketball, was located in Dorrance.

In the Action Comics #822 story titled 'Repo Man; part one', Dorrance is designated as the location of Smallville, Superman's childhood home.

References

Further reading

External links

 Dorrance - Directory of Public Officials
 Historic Images of Dorrance, Wichita State University Library
 Dorrance city map, KDOT

Cities in Kansas
Cities in Russell County, Kansas
Populated places established in 1870
1870 establishments in Kansas